Simón Bolívar Municipality may refer to the following places in Venezuela:

Simón Bolívar Municipality, Anzoátegui
Simón Bolívar, Miranda

See also
 Bolívar Municipality (disambiguation)

Municipality name disambiguation pages